Neelbad is a village in the Bhopal district of Madhya Pradesh, India. It is located in the Huzur tehsil and the Phanda block.

Neelbad is located on the Bhopal-Sehore road. Several educational institutes including Gargi Institute of Science and Technology, Bal Bharti Public School, Billabong High International School and Delhi Public School are located here.

Demographics 

According to the 2011 census of India, Neelbad has 894 households. The effective literacy rate (i.e. the literacy rate of population excluding children aged 6 and below) is 73.39%.

References 

Villages in Huzur tehsil